"Foxy Lady" (or alternatively "Foxey Lady") is a song by the Jimi Hendrix Experience. It first appeared on their 1967 debut album Are You Experienced and was later issued as their third single in the U.S. with the alternate spelling.  It is one of Hendrix's best-known songs and was frequently performed in concerts throughout his career. Rolling Stone magazine placed the song at number 153 on its list of the "500 Greatest Songs of All Time".

Composition and lyrics
Music critic Thomas Ward points out "if one song could be said to encapsulate Hendrix’s entire oeuvre, 'Foxey Lady' is certainly closer than most".  The song opens with a fingered note "shaken in a wide exaggerated vibrato" so the adjacent strings are sounded. After the amplifier is allowed to feed back, Hendrix slides down to the rhythm figure, which uses a dominant seventh sharp ninth chord, a jazz and rhythm and blues-style chord, often referred to as the "Hendrix chord". Hendrix's biographer Keith Shadwick writes:
  Prior to the recording, the group had not worked out an ending for the song and bassist Noel Redding claimed that using the last IV chord was his idea. Hendrix biographer Harry Shapiro suggests that song's lyrics were inspired by Heather Taylor, who later married Roger Daltrey of the Who. Hendrix later commented that he did not approach women in such a straightforward manner as the lyrics suggested. Lithofayne "Faye" Pridgon, Hendrix's girlfriend in the mid 1960s, has also been suggested as the inspiration for the song.

Releases and charts
Hendrix's American record company Reprise Records issued the song in December 1967, one month before the release of the second Experience album, Axis: Bold as Love. Reprise used the title "Foxey Lady", which also appeared on the North American release of Are You Experienced. It was backed with "Hey Joe", which Reprise had already released as a single in April 1967. Although Hendrix's albums performed quite well on the record charts, "Foxy Lady", along with the other early singles, made a relatively weak showing, peaking at number 67 on the Billboard Hot 100 pop singles chart. In 1967, Polydor Records issued the single in Germany with "Manic Depression" as the B-side, but it did not appear on the charts.

"Foxy Lady" has appeared on numerous Hendrix compilation albums, including Smash Hits, The Essential Jimi Hendrix Volume Two, 
Cornerstones: 1967–1970, The Ultimate Experience, Experience Hendrix: The Best of Jimi Hendrix, and The Singles Collection. It is also one of the few songs to be performed by each of the different Hendrix lineups, including the Experience, Gypsy Sun and Rainbows, the Band of Gypsys, and the Cry of Love touring group.  Live renditions appear on Live at Monterey, Live at Woodstock, Band of Gypsys 2, Blue Wild Angel: Live at the Isle of Wight, and several other live albums. Rolling Stone magazine ranked "Foxy Lady" at number 153 on its list of the "500 Greatest Songs of All Time". In 2020, Far Out ranked the song number six on their list of the 20 greatest Jimi Hendrix songs, and in 2021, American Songwriter ranked the song number four on their list of the 10 greatest Jimi Hendrix songs.

Footnotes

References

Sources

1967 singles
Reprise Records singles
The Jimi Hendrix Experience songs
Songs written by Jimi Hendrix
Song recordings produced by Chas Chandler
1966 songs